Argythamnia is a genus of plants of the family Euphorbiaceae first described as a genus in 1756. They are known commonly as silverbushes.

Species
As with many other genera, there have been many changes in classification the past several years. The following list includes species accepted as  members of Argythamnia as of September 2014. The species are native to Central America, Mexico, the West Indies, Colombia, and Texas.

formerly included
Moved to other genera (Caperonia Chiropetalum Croton Ditaxis Philyra Speranskia)

References

Chrozophoreae
Euphorbiaceae genera